Súľov-Hradná is a village and municipality in Bytča District in the Žilina Region of northern Slovakia.

History
In historical records the village was first mentioned in 1193.

Geography
The municipality lies at an altitude of 400 metres and covers an area of 22.953 km². It has a population of about 929 people.

The village is situated within the Súľov Mountains, and the highest mountain of the picturesque Súľov Rocks, Zibrid (867 m), is part of Súľov-Hradná's territory.

Gallery

References

External links
Municipal website 

Villages and municipalities in Bytča District